Mifflinburg Historic District is a national historic district located at Mifflinburg, Union County, Pennsylvania.  The district includes 233 contributing buildings in the central business district and surrounding residential areas of Mifflinburg.

It was added to the National Register of Historic Places in 1980.

References

Historic districts on the National Register of Historic Places in Pennsylvania
Buildings and structures in Union County, Pennsylvania
National Register of Historic Places in Union County, Pennsylvania